"Did You Hear What Happened to Charlotte King?" is the seventh episode of the fourth season of the American television medical drama Private Practice and the show's 61st episode overall. Written by Shonda Rhimes and directed by Allison Liddi-Brown, the episode was originally broadcast on ABC in the United States on November 4, 2010. Private Practice centers on a group of young doctors working in a private medical practice, and this episode deals with the immediate aftermath of Charlotte King's rape.

The episode, written in collaboration with the Rape, Abuse & Incest National Network (RAINN), revolved around KaDee Strickland's character, Charlotte, and was intended to accurately portray a victim's recovery from rape. Nicholas Brendon guest-starred as Lee McHenry, and Blue Deckert appeared as detective Joe Price. "Did You Hear What Happened to Charlotte King?" earned Rhimes, Strickland, and the series several awards and nominations and was well received by critics, with Strickland's character and performance praised. The initial broadcast was viewed by 10.18 million people, received a 3.9/11 Nielsen rating/share in the 18–49 demographic, and had the fifth-highest number of viewers that night.

Plot 
The episode opens with St. Ambrose Hospital chief of staff Charlotte King (KaDee Strickland) hiding in a supply closet after being raped in her office. Alternative-medicine specialist Dr. Pete Wilder (Tim Daly) finds and examines her, diagnosing a broken wrist, eye socket and nose and a deep arm laceration, and admits her to the hospital. King lies to Wilder, telling him that she was injured in a mugging. Wilder calls the police; King attempts to contact her boyfriend, Dr. Cooper Freedman (Paul Adelstein), but cannot reach him because he is out drinking with Dr. Amelia Shepherd (Caterina Scorsone) and Dr. Sam Bennett (Taye Diggs). At the police station psychiatrist Sheldon Wallace (Brian Benben) interrogates Lee McHenry (Nicholas Brendon), who was found with blood on his clothes. After nurses photograph King's injuries, Dr. Addison Montgomery (Kate Walsh) realizes that King was raped and offers her a rape kit. During her pelvic examination, King refuses the rape kit and tells Montgomery not to tell anyone else about the rape. Freedman arrives with Shepherd and Bennett, and is surprised at the extent of King's injuries. During the CT scan, King and Shepherd bond over their shared drug addiction when King refuses pain medication. Shepherd admits drinking alcohol again, and King offers to take her to Alcoholics Anonymous meetings. Shepherd sutures King's wounds, which causes King great pain; Freedman feels powerless, unable to protect her.

Interviewed by Wallace, McHenry admits being angry after discovering his girlfriend's infidelity but denies that the blood on his clothing is hers. Montgomery tries to convince King to report her rape; King refuses, telling Montgomery that she does not understand what it is like to be raped. Wilder uses alternative medicine to help King deal with her pain. Psychiatrist Violet Turner (Amy Brenneman) refuses to talk to King about the rape because of similarities to the fetal abduction she experienced a year earlier, and wonders if everyone in the practice is cursed. Bennett wants to go home and rest, which angers Montgomery. King attempts to compose a memorandum saying that she was attacked on the hospital grounds, but Freedman suggests that another member of the staff do it for her; she shouts at Freedman when he calls her a victim. After the argument, Freedman goes to King's office and weeps when he sees the aftermath of her assault. McHenry admits raping a woman, assaulting Wallace before he is pulled away by the police. In the ambulance bay, Bennett expresses his confusion about Montgomery's mood swings and suspects that she is hiding something from him; Montgomery asks him to promise never to leave her alone. After Freedman helps her dress, King says that she loves him and wants to go home. McHenry is held by the police for assaulting a police officer during his arrest and Wallace during his interrogation, but detective Joe Price says that McHenry cannot be charged with rape until charges are filed against him. The episode ends with King walking out of the hospital with Freedman's help; flashbacks of the rape reveal that McHenry was the rapist.

Production 

The 43-minute episode was written by Shonda Rhimes and directed by Allison Liddi-Brown. Christal A. Khatib edited the music, and Gregory Van Horn was its production designer. Johann Sebastian Bach's Prelude and Fugue in C was played during the opening sequence. Rhimes wrote the episode in collaboration with the Rape, Abuse & Incest National Network (RAINN) to ensure that King's recovery was presented as accurately as possible. She later called it one of her favorites from the series and said, "I feel like I changed as a writer writing that episode."

Approached by Rhimes about the concept, Strickland agreed to the storyline on the conditions that it would not be limited to a single episode and would significantly impact the character. She liked the script, describing it as "humanizing the victims and just really creating a legitimate experience for the audience in a way that you may not see on network television". As well as communicating with RAINN representatives, the actress visited the Rape Treatment Center at UCLA Medical Center in Santa Monica and saw a young girl being admitted, which shaped her performance. Strickland also researched reactions to sexual assault by survivors, their friends and families. The decision to portray King's resistance to reporting her rape was reached after consultation with the Rape Treatment Center. Strickland defended the choice, calling it an essential aspect of King's character development. Most of the episode focused on King's psychological response to the rape. According to Strickland,

The actress described the filming of the rape as easier than the scenes depicting its aftermath, which she called "psychologically ... [and] ... physically hard". Strickland and Brendon agreed on a safeword when they filmed the rape, due to its brutality. The scene affected Strickland to the extent that she found it difficult to act on the set on which the rape was shot. The actress called the filming process "intense" and "truthful", but "by no means is any of that even comparable to anything that women and men have had experience with". Brendon was cast against type as McHenry, King's rapist, since he is primarily known for portraying the comedic Xander Harris in Buffy the Vampire Slayer. Strickland said that Brendon's character should not be interpreted as crazy, because perpetrators of rape are "people who are around us all the time"; she called Brendon's acceptance of the role "brave".

According to Strickland, every character on the show was affected by King's rape. The episode explored Freedman's identity and response as the partner of a rape victim, with Adelstein identifying his character as "a conscious 21st-century male" in his interactions with King. According to Strickland, Montgomery's decision to use the rape kit on King without her knowledge would be a major storyline in the future and Turner would become persistent in getting help for King after learning about the rape since the characters had similar traumatic experiences. A behind-the-scenes feature about the episode and others involving King's rape, "An Inside Look: The Violation of Charlotte King", was included on the fourth-season DVD and Blu-ray releases.

Reception

Broadcast 
"Did You Hear What Happened to Charlotte King?" was originally broadcast on November 4, 2010 in the United States on the ABC network. The episode was viewed by a total of 10.18 million people, and had a 44 percent increase from the previous episode "All in the Family", which earned an average rating of 7.68. Although it was the fifth-highest-rated show that night (behind CBS's The Big Bang Theory, $#*! My Dad Says, CSI and The Mentalist), its 3.9/11 Nielsen rating topped the 10:00 Eastern time slot for the rating and share percentages of the 18–49 demographic. The episode was aired with a message encouraging viewer discretion, due to its violence. The following episode "What Happens Next" saw a decrease in ratings, and was viewed by a total of 8.21 million people.

Critical response 

The critical response was largely positive, with a TV Guide writer ranking "Did You Hear What Happened to Charlotte King?" one of 2010's top 25 television episodes. Alec Stern of The Michigan Daily cited the episode as an example of the show's improved quality, and The Futon Critic's Brian Ford Sullivan also included it in his list of 50 best episodes of 2010. Strickland's performance received an overwhelmingly positive response after the episode first aired. The reviewer from TV Guide felt that Strickland's performance was worthy of an Emmy, and that the first time Freedman saw King's injuries was "like we weren't even watching TV anymore". A TVLine post later listed Strickland as one of the Emmy Awards' 21 biggest snubs. E! News Kristin dos Santos also praised Strickland's portrayal of King, writing that she deserved an Emmy nomination, and Winston Mize of SpoilerTV wrote that Strickland was "robbed. of. all. the. awards". TV Fanatic Steve Marsi liked the episode, saying that its pacing and Strickland's performance immersed the audience despite the difficult subject matter.

The treatment of rape in the episode has been widely praised by television critics. SpoilerTV's Winston Mize felt that it was one of Rhimes' best shows, and that it avoided a preachy or excessively-dramatic take on rape. JeromeWetzelTV of Blogcritics found the episode "disturbing, intense, tragic, and moving", with the rape handled delicately and responsibly. E! News''' Jennifer Arrow described the rape scene as "the most realistic depiction of rape in media history" and noted Brendon's casting as an evil character in contrast with his more light-hearted performance as Harris in Buffy the Vampire Slayer.

The depiction of King's rape and its aftermath was compared to similar storylines on other shows. Arrow called it part of the "rape-on-TV trend", linking King's rape with those of Gemma Teller Morrow of FX's crime drama Sons of Anarchy and Naomi Clark of the CW teen drama 90210. According to Arrow, all three characters were "strong, no-nonsense ladies who generally dominate their environments" and did not report their rape. She asked if each show's decision for the victim not to report the rape was part of a larger cultural belief that "trusts in women who keep their silence". TV Fanatic Steve Marsi called the episode reminiscent of Law & Order: Special Victims Unit in its presentation of events in real time and emphasis on character reactions. The Michigan Daily Alec Stern called sexual assault "a crutch Shonda Rhimes has turned to in all three of her series", writing that the development of King's character was superior to the storyline of Mellie Grant's rape on the ABC drama Scandal.

 Awards and impact 
The episode was cited at the 2011 Television Academy Honors for exemplifying "Television with a Conscience". The Academy of Television Arts & Sciences praised the episode for "master[ing] the gut-wrenching crime of sexual assault". Private Practice received the award in 2010 for its approach to physician-assisted suicide in the second-season episode, "Nothing to Fear", and a drama-series Women's Image Network Award at the 13th annual WIN awards. "Did You Hear What Happened to Charlotte King?" was a finalist for the Sentinel for Health Award for Primetime Drama (Major Storyline) for its representation of rape, losing to the Parenthood episode "Qualities and Difficulties" (which focused on Asperger syndrome). The show was nominated for the PRISM Award for Drama Series Multi-Episode Storyline (Mental Health) for "Did You Hear What Happened to Charlotte King?" and the following episodes, "What Happens Next" and "Can't Find My Way Back Home", losing to the first two seasons of Parenthood''.

Rhimes and Strickland received a RAINN Hope Award in recognition of "their efforts in educating the public about sexual assault prevention". Strickland said that she considered submitting the episode, or the later episodes "Can't Find My Way Home" or "Blind Love," for consideration at the 63rd Primetime Emmy Awards, but she did not receive a nomination. The actress received the Female Performance in a Drama Series Multi-Episode Storyline award at the 2011 PRISM Awards. Rhimes received the NAACP Image Award for Outstanding Writing in a Dramatic Series at the 2011 NAACP Awards for her work on the episode.

After its broadcast, RAINN had a "500-percent increase in service requests" (which temporarily crashed its website). Strickland participated in a public service announcement to increase awareness of rape and sexual abuse, and said that she had received many emails from survivors of sexual assault. After her work on the episode, RAINN called the actress a "vocal advocate for using DNA evidence in solving rape cases".

References

External links 
 

2010 American television episodes
Private Practice (TV series)
Television Academy Honors winners
Television episodes about rape
Television episodes set in Los Angeles